Cimmeritodes is a genus of beetles in the family Carabidae, first described by Thierry Deuve in 1996.

Species 
Cimmeritodes contains the following five species:

 Cimmeritodes crassifemoralis Deuve & Tian, 2016
 Cimmeritodes huangi (Deuve, 1996)
 Cimmeritodes parvus Tian & Li, 2016
 Cimmeritodes zhejiangensis Deuve & Tian, 2015
 Cimmeritodes zhongfangensis Deuve & Tian, 2016

References

Trechinae